Susan E. King is an artist, educator and writer who is best known for her artist's books.

Early life and education
King grew up in Kentucky. She received a B.A. in Ceramics from University of Kentucky and a master's degree in Art from University of New Mexico.

Career

Artist and educator
At the University of New Mexico, she taught one of the first Women and Art courses in the U.S. in 1973. For several years she taught letterpress printing at Otis College of Art and Design. She lectures, teaches workshops and has been an artist-in-residence at numerous art centers and universities around the U.S.

She came to California to be part of the Feminist Art Program at the Woman's Building, where she held the position of Studio Director of the Women's Graphic Center.

Author
She publishes books through the Paradise Press imprint and currently divides her time between Kentucky and California. Her books are often memoirs about travel. One of her well-known books, Treading the Maze, An artist's journey through breast cancer, published by Chronicle was created as what she calls "a journey through the land of cancer." King has been written about in The Penland Book of Handmade Books: Master Classes in Bookmaking Techniques, representing master craftsmen at the Penland School of Crafts.

A National Endowment for the Arts grant was awarded to a collaborative team with Sheila Levrant de Bretteville and Bettye Saar. She was awarded a book production grant from the Women's Studio Workshop and the Visual Studies Workshop in 1984. She also won a book production grant from Nexus Press. In 2000, she was awarded the Early Times Scholarship Travel Grant from the Kentucky Arts and Craft Foundation. She was awarded a book fellowship in 2001 from the National Museum of Women in the Arts. She was awarded a Small Press Grant from the National Endowment for the Arts.

Her artist books are included in the collections of major libraries, like those at Harvard University, and the Getty Research Library. They are also among the collections of the Museum of Modern Art, New York, the Victoria and Albert Museum London, Brooklyn Museum of Art, and Otis College of Art and Design Library in Los Angeles.

Exhibitions

 "Paradise Meets Purgatory The Watson Library," the Metropolitan Museum of Art, 1986 
 "Books Without Bounds," Irvine Fine Arts Center, 1987
 "Unseen Hands: Women printers, Binders and Book Designers," Princeton University Library, 2002  
 "The Artist Turns to the Book," Getty Research Institute, The Getty Museum, 2005
 30 years of Innovation: A Survey of Exhibition History at the Center for Book Arts, 1974–2004 / organized by Jae Jennifer Rossman, guest curator, April 15 through July 1, 2005.
 "Doin' It in Public: Feminism and the Art of the Woman's Building," Otis College of Art and Design, Los Angeles, 2011
 Exploding the Codex: The Theater of the Book, San Francisco Center for the Book, June 1 - August 31, 2012.
 "Chapters: Book Arts in Southern California," Craft and Folk Art Museum, Los Angeles, CA 2017
 Binding Desire: Unfolding Artists Books

References

Further reading
 American Craft Council. "The Penland Book of Handmade Books: Master Classes in Bookmaking Techniques." October/November 2005.
 "Artists' writings: Susan E. King's I spent the summer in Paris. Art Journal. Winter90, Vol. 49, p348-355.
 Carmin, James H., and Joan Stahl. Book Review: HIGH TENSION/THIS IS NOT AMERICA: EITHER/TREADING THE MAZE. Art Documentation: Bulletin of the Art Libraries Society of North America; Spring 1994, Vol. 13 Issue 1, p41-41.
 Courtney, Cathy. "Stresses and Strains," Art Monthly; March 1998, Issue 214, p37-38.
 CAA. Reviews. "Book Art Biennial 2009: Mature Content--The Artist's Book as Advocate Minnesota Center for Book Arts, Minneapolis, MN July 25, 2009. January 20, 2010.
 
 Drucker, Johanna, The Century of Artist's Books, Granary Books, 1995, p. 139.
 "Healing Correspondences," Women's Review of Books, Vol. XIV, no. 12, September 1997.
 Healy, Eloise Klein, "Travel Diaries of a Prodigal Daughter", Zyzzyva, Vol. V, no. 1.
 Hoffberg, Judith. "Susan E. King," ArtScene, Los Angeles, June 1994.
 Hubert, Judd D.; Hubert, Renée Riese, "The Book, the Museum, and Public Art," SubStance, # 82, Vol. XXVI, no. 1, 1997.
 Hubert, Renée Riese  in collaboration with Judd D. Hubert, "Susan King's Marriage of True Minds and Clarissa Sligh's Open House Biography," (auto)biographical Writing and the Artist's Book, AbraCadaBrA, Journal of Alliance for Contemporary Book Arts, Spring 1996.
 Kort, Michele. "Georgia on my Mind," Distaff column, L.A. Weekly, November 8, 1985, p. 14.
 Petro, Pamela. "Books as Works of Art," Atlantic, October 1990. 
 
 
 Tovish, Nina. "Envisioning the Word: Books as Works of Art," The Bookpress, Vol 3, no. 4, May 1993.

External links
 

1947 births
Living people
20th-century American women artists
Book artists
Artists from Lexington, Kentucky
Women educators
Feminist artists
Kentucky women artists
Kentucky women in education
University of Kentucky alumni
University of New Mexico alumni
Otis College of Art and Design faculty
American women academics
21st-century American women